The Guild of the Brave Poor Things was a British charity for disabled children. It was established in 1894 by Dame Grace Kimmins (1871–1954) et al. to provide resources for disabled boys to enable them to make a productive place for themselves in society.

History
Play was seen as a major positive addition to the more traditional methods of learning by rote and of other much more drilled aspects of the elementary schools of the time, especially when teaching the physically handicapped.  This resonates with teaching in mainstream schools today where play is a part of the  UK's National Curriculum for all children.

The Guild of the Brave Poor Things provided education for physically handicapped children (in those days the term "crippled" was current and not viewed as pejorative).

In 1894, Kimmins organised a meeting which resulted in the foundation of the Guild of the  Brave Poor Things. Juliana Horatia Ewing's 1885 novel The Story of a Short Life inspired Kimmins to start the Guild to help children with disabilities. Grace (and later Ada Vachell took their motto ‘Laetus sorte mea’ (‘Happy in my lot’) from Ewing's book.

Child Life, the journal of the Froebel Society, described the Guild as "a band of men, women, and children of any creed or none, who are disabled for the battle of life, and at the same time are determined to fight a good fight". While this may seem patronising in the 21st century it was typical of the way good quality initiatives were started by women of strong character in the 19th century. In 1895 the guild inspired Ada Vachell to create a similar facility in Bristol which continued until 1987.

The Guild of the Brave Poor Things also spawned the Chailey Heritage residential centre.

Supporters
Millicent Fawcett (1847–1929), the leader of the National Union of Women's Suffrage Societies
Hugh Price Hughes (1847–1902), American Christian theologian, who ran the West London Mission, which provided premises for the Guild of the Brave Poor Things prior to its move first to Bermondsey University Settlement and later to the Chapter House of Southwark Cathedral
Mary Neal (1860–1944), responsible for the direction of play sessions at Marchmont Hall
Emmeline Pethick, better known as Emmeline Pethick-Lawrence (1867–1954) and a leader of the substantially more militant Women's Social and Political Union (WSPU) and a 'Sister of the People' at the West London Mission.
Mrs Mary Ward (1851-1920), suffragette and novelist
Lord Llangattock (the 1st Baron Llangattock) (1837–1912), responsible for finance for Boys and Girls Craft Schools.

Archives
Local branches of the Guild hold archives in their corresponding county record office. The National Archives Discovery Catalogue lists the Hull Branch held at Hull History Centre, the Reading Branch held at Berkshire Record Office, and the Bedford Branch held at Bedfordshire Archives and Records Service. The records of the 'Bristol Guild of the Handicapped', known up until 1918 as the 'Guild of the Brave Poor Things' are held at Bristol Archives (Ref. 39842) (online catalogue).

The History of Place project has been researching archival histories of the Guild which will lead to an exhibition at M Shed in Bristol during 2018.

Other resources
Part of the Guild of the Brave Poor Things facilities via the Chailey Heritage, but at some distance from Chailey itself was the now derelict Heritage Marine Hospital at Tide Mills on the beach east of Newhaven harbour.

References

External links
 A Great Army of Sufferings': The Guild of the Brave Poor Things 'A Great Army of Sufferings': The Guild of the Brave Poor Things and Disability in the Late 19th and Early 20th Centuries - Michael Mantin - University of Bristol - History Department (Best Undergraduate dissertations of 2009)
Chailey Heritage Hospital, From the archives of Sussex County Council
Sussex Industrial Archeological Society Visit To Bishopstone Tide Mills
Information on the Guild Heritage, Bristol Pamphlet on the Guild Heritage, Bristol which was the built by the Guild of the Brave Poor Things in 1913. Commissioned by the owners in 2012.

Charities for disabled people based in the United Kingdom
1894 establishments in the United Kingdom